The Raconteurs (also known as The Saboteurs in Australia) is an American rock band from Detroit, Michigan, formed in 2005. The band consists of Jack White (vocals, guitar), Brendan Benson (vocals, guitar), Jack Lawrence (bass guitar), and Patrick Keeler (drums). Lawrence and Keeler were originally members of the Greenhornes, while White and Lawrence went on to become members of the Dead Weather.

History
The band is based in Nashville, Tennessee. According to the band's official website, "The seed was sown in an attic in the middle of a hot summer when friends Jack White and Brendan Benson got together and wrote a song that truly inspired them. This song was 'Steady, As She Goes' and the inspiration led to the creation of a full band with the addition of Lawrence and Keeler." The band came together in Detroit during 2005 and recorded when time allowed for the remainder of the year. Due to the various members' success in other bands, they were quickly dubbed a supergroup. The band, however, asserted they were not, saying that the term implies something pre-planned or temporary, whereas they are actually "a new band made up of old friends."

The band are known as "The Saboteurs" in the Australian market, due to a Queensland band already using the name "Raconteurs". The Queensland band refused to give up their name for the amount of money they were offered, and instead asked for a higher price from The Raconteurs' record company, who refused to pay the greater amount. A member of the Queensland band said that they had not been informed of who was trying to buy their name and asked for the larger sum of money to see what would happen.

The band has played a number of music festivals in Europe, Asia, and North America (including Oxegen in Ireland; Reading Festival, Leeds Festival, Glastonbury Festival, and T in the Park in the United Kingdom; Heineken Open'er Festival in Poland; Vegoose in Las Vegas; Lollapalooza in Chicago; Bonnaroo in Manchester, Tennessee; Austin City Limits Music Festival in Austin, Texas; Coachella in Indio, California; and Orlando Calling in Orlando, Florida), headlining many.

2005–2007: Broken Boy Soldiers

The Raconteurs' full-length debut, Broken Boy Soldiers, was recorded at Brendan Benson's in-home studio located in Detroit. The first single was "Steady, As She Goes/Store Bought Bones" and was released as a limited-edition 7-inch, 45 rpm vinyl record in Europe on January 30, 2006, and in North America on March 7, 2006. A CD version of "Steady, As She Goes" was released on April 24, 2006, with the B-side "Bane Rendition".

The Raconteurs first performed live at the Academy in Liverpool, UK, on March 20, 2006, launching a short British tour. Their first American date was the following month, on April 20, at New York City's Irving Plaza. Nearly nonstop touring followed, bringing the band to audiences around North America and Europe. The high profile of Jack White meant that even though the band was new, they were able to sell out mid-size venues—a rarity for a band's first tour.

Broken Boy Soldiers was released on May 15, 2006, in the UK on Third Man Recordings/XL Recordings and May 16 in the U.S. on Third Man Recordings/V2 Records. It entered the UK charts at No. 2 and the U.S. charts at No. 7.

In November 2006, the Raconteurs played eight dates as the opening act for Bob Dylan on the north-eastern leg of his U.S. tour. On November 3, 2006, the Raconteurs performed the song "Store Bought Bones" and the title track, "Broken Boy Soldier" on Later with Jools Holland. According to Planet Sound (who had reporters in attendance), during "Store Bought Bones", White's guitar malfunctioned and they had to re-play the song. This eventually happened four times, with the band breaking up in laughter by the fourth take. The TV airing used edited pieces from all four performances and cut out any laughter. The band's cover of "Teenage Kicks" by The Undertones appeared on a 40-year anniversary of the BBC live compilation. They played it live on a John Peel tribute.

The band has performed a number of covers during live shows. For instance, the set list usually includes renditions of "Bang Bang (My Baby Shot Me Down)" (a song written by Sonny Bono and popularized by both Cher and Nancy Sinatra) and "Headin' for the Texas Border" by The Flamin' Groovies. Other songs the band has covered include Gnarls Barkley's "Crazy", Bo Diddley's "Who Do You Love?", Ron Davies' "It Ain't Easy", Love's "A House Is Not a Motel", and Charley Jordan's "Keep It Clean". The band has also covered the song "Floating" by the Irish band Jape, and "Send Me a Postcard", by Dutch band Shocking Blue. They have also performed an old Blues song written by Big Joe Williams in 1935 (popularized by Van Morrison's "Them" in 1964), "Baby, Please Don't Go."

In December 2006, the band's debut album, Broken Boy Soldiers, was awarded the title Album of the Year by Britain's Mojo magazine. In 2007, the album was nominated for the Grammy Award for Best Rock Album. The Raconteurs were nominated for two awards at the 49th Annual Grammys: one for Best Rock Album for Broken Boy Soldiers, and another for Best Rock Performance by a Duo or Group with Vocal for "Steady, As She Goes" although they did not win in either category.
The intro and ending of "Steady, As She Goes" is often used to play out Saturday Live, a long running radio programme on BBC Radio4.

2008–2009: Consolers of the Lonely

The Raconteurs released their second album, Consolers of the Lonely, on March 25, 2008. The first single, "Salute Your Solution", was released the same day.

The band also played tour dates including: Coachella on April 25, the New Orleans Jazz & Heritage Festival on May 4, Bonnaroo on June 13, T in the Park in Scotland on July 12, Oxegen festival in Ireland on July 13 and The Open'er Festival in Poland on July 4. They played at "The Pyramid Stage" at the Glastonbury Festival 2008 on June 28, the Montreux Jazz festival on July 7, at Lollapalooza on August 1, and on the main stage of Reading and Leeds Festival 2008 on August 23 and 24, as well as at the Austin City Limits Music Festival on September 26–28, 2008. They played "The Eden Sessions" at the Eden Project in Cornwall on June 29. The band also toured the U.S. during summer 2008. In 2009, Consolers of the Lonely was nominated for the Grammy Award for Best Rock Album but lost to Coldplay's album Viva La Vida, or Death and All His Friends but the band did win the Grammy Award for Best Engineered Album, Non-Classical.

2010–2018: Dormancy and recording hiatus
In an interview in February 2010, Brendan Benson stated that the future of The Raconteurs was ambiguous, stating "I think we're all just really focused on other things." He went on to add that "it will come around and we'll get together again and hang out and maybe make a record or maybe not." On April 17, 2010, Benson and Keeler performed Raconteurs songs as The Racontwoers at Jack White's Third Man Records venue to coincide with a repressing of Broken Boy Soldiers on copper-colored vinyl. The pair was accompanied by Mark Watrous and Andrew Higley.
The band played at the MI Fest on September 17, 2011, as well as September 15 at the Ryman Auditorium in Nashville, Tennessee. On November 12, 2011, the band played the inaugural Orlando Calling festival in Orlando, Fl. The Raconteurs announced an additional American show to play at The Tabernacle in Atlanta, Georgia on November 13, 2011. In April 2012, Third Man Records released two songs that were supposed to appear on Consolers of the Lonely: "Open Your Eyes" and "You Make a Fool Out of Me". The songs were re-recorded for Brendan Benson's next solo album 'My Old, Familiar Friend'. In February 2013, Jack White announced that the band was back in the studio recording new music. In March 2014, in an interview in The Guardian newspaper, Brendan Benson announced that a new album was "kind of off the table", suggesting that a new album was not currently in the works, and that the band's hiatus was more like a split.

Benson and Lawrence joined White onstage during the encore of his January 28, 2015 concert at the Bridgestone Arena in Nashville, TN.  They played "Salute Your Solution" and "Steady, As She Goes".  Keeler was unable to join since he was on tour with The Afghan Whigs at the time.

2018–present: Help Us Stranger
On October 8, 2018, Third Man Records announced a deluxe reissue of Consolers of the Lonely through the label's Vault quarterly subscription service would feature two newly-recorded songs, "Sunday Driver" and "Now That You're Gone", on an accompanied 7-inch vinyl. Both songs were made available digitally on December 19 and subsequently were included on the 2019 album Help Us Stranger. The album was released on June 21, 2019.

Help Us Stranger was recorded at Third Man Studio in Nashville. White and Benson wrote all songs except for a cover of "Hey Gyp (Dig The Slowness)", by Donovan. The album was produced by The Raconteurs and engineered by Joshua V. Smith. Musical collaborators included Dean Fertita of The Dead Weather and Queens of the Stone Age and Lillie Mae and Scarlett Rische of Jypsi. The album was mixed by Vance Powell and The Raconteurs at Blackbird Studios in Nashville.

The band announced plans for a live album entitled Live in Tulsa, which was recorded live at Cain's Ballroom in Tulsa, Oklahoma  from October 13, 2019 through October 16, 2019.

In May 2020, the band released their Live at Electric Lady EP and documentary via Spotify. The documentary features a studio cover of the Richard Hell & the Voidoids classic “Blank Generation” as well as the full concert in studio A.

Band members
 Jack White – vocals, lead guitar, keyboards, organ, piano, stylophone, mandolin, production
 Brendan Benson – vocals, rhythm guitar, keyboards, organ, piano
 Patrick Keeler – drums, percussion, backing vocals
 Jack Lawrence – bass guitar, banjo, backing vocals

Touring members
 Dean Fertita – keyboards, percussion, guitar, backing vocals (2006; 2011; 2019–present)
 Mark Watrous – keyboards, fiddle, percussion, violin, vocals (2008)

Discography

Studio albums

Singles

Other charted songs

Live recordings

Other contributions

Music videos

Notes

Awards and nominations

Brit Awards

|-
| 2007
| The Raconteurs
| International Breakthrough Act
| 
|-

Country Music Awards

|-
| 2009
| "Old Enough"
| Musical Event of the Year
|

Grammy Awards

|-
|style="text-align:center;" rowspan="2"| 2007 || Broken Boy Soldiers || Best Rock Album || 
|-
| "Steady, as She Goes" || Best Rock Performance by a Duo or Group with Vocal || 
|-
| style="text-align:center;" rowspan="2"| 2009 || style="text-align:left;" rowspan="2"|Consolers of the Lonely || Best Rock Album || 
|-
| Best Engineered Non-Classical Album || 
|-

Mojo Magazine

|-
| 2006
| Broken Boy Soldiers
| Album of the Year
|

MTV Europe Music Awards

|-
| style="text-align:center;" rowspan="1"| 2006 ||style="text-align:left;" rowspan="1"|The Raconteurs || Best Alternative ||

mtvU Woodie Awards

|-
| 2006
| "Steady, As She Goes" video
| Best Live Action Video
|

References

External links

Brendan Benson Interview with Jarrod Dicker

American power pop groups
American blues rock musical groups
Alternative rock groups from Michigan
Garage rock groups from Michigan
Indie rock musical groups from Michigan
Musical groups established in 2005
Musical groups from Detroit
Musical groups from Nashville, Tennessee
Musical quartets
Rock music supergroups
XL Recordings artists
Jack White
Third Man Records artists